Winter X Games XV (styled as Winter X Games Fifteen in the official logo) were held from January 26 to January 30, 2011, in Aspen, Colorado. They are the 10th consecutive Winter X Games to be held in Aspen. The events were broadcast on ESPN.

Sports
The following are the events at Winter X Games 15.

Skiing
Snowboarding
Snowmobiling

Highlights
In the 2011 Aspen Winter X Games, Torstein Horgmo performed the first Triple cork in X Games history. He did this in the big air competition, coming in first place.

Schedule

All times listed are Mountain Standard Time (MST).

Results

Medal Count

Skiing

Men's Slopestyle Results

Women's Slopestyle Results

Men's SuperPipe Results

Women's SuperPipe Results

Men's Big Air Results

Men's Skier X Results

Women's Skier X Results

Men's Mono Skier X Results

Snowboarding

Men's SuperPipe Results

Women's SuperPipe Results

Men's Snowboard X Results

Women's Snowboard X Results

Men's Big Air Results

Men's Slopestyle Results

Women's Slopestyle  Results

Men's Snowboard Street Results

Men's Best Method Results

Men's Snowmobile

Freestyle Results

Speed & Style

Best Trick Results

SnoCross Results

SnoCross Adaptive Results

References

External links
  Winter X Games XV Page

Winter X Games
2011 in multi-sport events
2011 in American sports
Sports in Colorado
Pitkin County, Colorado
2011 in sports in Colorado
Winter multi-sport events in the United States
International sports competitions hosted by the United States
January 2011 sports events in the United States